or  is a lake in Fauske Municipality in Nordland county, Norway. Water flows into the lake from the large lake Balvatnet (in Saltdal Municipality) and it flows out of the lake to the north along the Balmi River to the lake Langvatnet.

See also
 List of lakes in Norway
 Geography of Norway

References

Fauske
Lakes of Nordland